Cortinarius caninus is a basidiomycota mushroom in the family of Cortinariaceae.

General
The Cortinarius are a superior mushroom, due to their cortina (a type of very fine veil). This is the most prolific genus of fungus, and numbers in the thousands.

Description
Cortinarius caninus has a creamy brown cap measuring up to 9 cm in diameter. The foot is fibrous and bulbous and measures from 5–11 cm in height, with a diameter of 0.8 to 1.4 cm.
It sprouts in autumn in forests, especially conifer.

The species is inedible.

Gallery

References

 https://web.archive.org/web/20110722071902/http://www.cegep-sept-iles.qc.ca/raymondboyer/champignons/Cortinaires_S.html

External links

caninus
Fungi described in 1821
Inedible fungi